Legislative elections were held in El Salvador on 28 February 2021 to elect the 84 members of the Legislative Assembly, 20 members of the Central American Parliament and 262 mayors. The result was a landslide victory for Nuevas Ideas with pro-Bukele parties winning a supermajority of seats.

Electoral system 

The 84 members of the Legislative Assembly are elected by open list proportional representation from 14 multi-member constituencies based on the departments, with seats allocated using the largest remainder method.

The 20 members of the Central American Parliament are elected by open list proportional representation in a single nationwide constituency, with seats allocated using the largest remainder method.

Parties

Parliamentary parties

Non-parliamentary parties

Retiring deputies 

Sixteen incumbent deputies did not run for re-election in 2021. Those incumbents were:

Opinion polls 

The following table lists estimates of intention to vote nationwide. Refusals are generally excluded from those of the party's vote, while the wording of the questions and the treatment of the answers "I don't know" and those that do not intend to vote may vary among the voting organizations. When available, seating projections are shown below the percentages in a smaller source.

Nationwide polling

Graphical summary

Voting intention estimates

Conduct

Controversial discussion between Olivo and Bukele 

The Magistrate of the Supreme Electoral Tribunal, Julio Olivo Granadino, has declared himself an opponent of the Government of the President, Nayib Bukele. For this new magistracy in the TSE, Olivo was the first candidate of the preselection proposed by the FMLN. His appointment to said institution faced a lawsuit of unconstitutionality, presented by the constitutional lawyer Salvador Enrique Anaya.

New Ideas candidates refused registration 

Through its social networks, the New Ideas political party denounced that the Electoral Board (JED) of the Supreme Electoral Tribunal (TSE) in Cabañas refused to register its candidates so that they could participate in the elections.

Results

Legislative Assembly

Municipalities

Central American Parliament

References

External links 

Tribunal Supremo Electoral 

El Salvador
2021 in El Salvador
Legislative elections in El Salvador